In mathematics, specifically in the field known as category theory, a monoidal category where the monoidal ("tensor") product is the categorical product is called a cartesian monoidal category. Any category with finite products (a "finite product category") can be thought of as a cartesian monoidal category. In any cartesian monoidal category, the terminal object is the monoidal unit. Dually, a monoidal finite coproduct category with the monoidal structure given by the coproduct and unit the initial object is called a cocartesian monoidal category, and any finite coproduct category can be thought of as a cocartesian monoidal category.

Cartesian categories with an internal Hom functor that is an adjoint functor to the product are called Cartesian closed categories.

Properties 
Cartesian monoidal categories have a number of special and important properties, such as the existence of diagonal maps Δx : x → x ⊗ x and augmentations ex : x → I for any object x. In applications to computer science we can think of Δ as "duplicating data" and e as "deleting data". These maps make any object into a comonoid. In fact, any object in a cartesian monoidal category becomes a comonoid in a unique way.

Examples 
Cartesian monoidal categories: 
Set, the category of sets with the singleton set serving as the unit.
Cat, the bicategory of small categories with the product category, where the category with one object and only its identity map is the unit. 
Cocartesian monoidal categories: 
Vect, the category of vector spaces over a given field, can be made cocartesian monoidal with the monoidal product given by the direct sum of vector spaces and the trivial vector space as unit. 
Ab, the category of abelian groups, with the direct sum of abelian groups as monoidal product and the trivial group as unit. 
 More generally, the category R-Mod of (left) modules over a ring R (commutative or not) becomes a cocartesian monoidal category with the direct sum of modules as tensor product and the trivial module as unit.

In each of these categories of modules equipped with a cocartesian monoidal structure, finite products and coproducts coincide (in the sense that the product and coproduct of finitely many objects are isomorphic). If, in addition, the category in question has a zero object, so that for any objects A and B there is a unique map 0A,B : A → 0 → B, it often follows that  pk ∘ ij = : δij, the Kronecker delta, where we interpret 0 and 1 as the 0 maps and identity maps of the objects Xj and Xk, respectively. See pre-additive category for more.

See also
 Cartesian closed category

References 

Category theory
Monoidal categories